Ceyzériat station (French: Gare de Ceyzériat) is a French railway station located in commune of Ceyzériat, Ain department in the Auvergne-Rhône-Alpes region. It is located at kilometric point (KP) 9.864 on the Bourg-en-Bresse—Bellegarde railway.

Originally opened in 1876, the station was closed in 2005 for renovations along the Haut-Bugey railway as well as reconstruction of the station, prior to re-opening in 2010.

As of 2020, the station is owned and operated by the SNCF and served by TER Auvergne-Rhône-Alpes trains.

History 
The station was opened by the Compagnie des Dombes et des chemins de fer Sud-Est on 10 March 1876 along with a section of railway from Bourg-en-Bresse to Simandre-sur-Suran.

The station was closed for reconstruction in 2005, along with the remainder of the line, before re-opening on 12 December 2010. The old passenger building was torn down in June 2010, along with those of Villereversure and Cize-Bolozon.

In 2019, the SNCF estimated that 6,762 passengers traveled through the station.

Services

Passenger services 
Classified as a PANG (point d'accès non géré), the station is unstaffed without any passenger services.

Train services 
As of 2020, the station is served by the following services:

 Regional services (TER Auvergne-Rhône-Alpes 31) Bourg-en-Bresse ... Brion-Montréal-la-Cluse ... Oyonnax ... Saint-Claude.

Intermodality 
The station is equipped with a parking lot for passenger vehicles and secured storage for bicycles.

Gallery

References 

Railway stations in Ain
Railway stations in France opened in 1876